Pierre Couquelet (born 7 August 1964) is a Belgian alpine skier. He competed in three events at the 1984 Winter Olympics.

He was scheduled to compete as sighted guide for visually impaired para-alpine skier Linda Le Bon at the 2022 Winter Paralympics in Beijing, China. Couquelet was not able to compete as her guide after failing a doping test due to an administrative error related to medication that he takes. He competed as her guide at the 2021 World Para Snow Sports Championships held in Lillehammer, Norway.

References

External links
 

1964 births
Living people
Belgian male alpine skiers
Olympic alpine skiers of Belgium
Alpine skiers at the 1984 Winter Olympics
Sportspeople from Liège
Paralympic sighted guides